Tarpey may refer to:
Tarpey, California
David Tarpey, Irish kickboxer